Comworld Pictures was a movie distributor that existed from 1980 to 1986.

Movies released by that company
Seasons in the Sun (1986)
New Girl (1985)
In Search of a Golden Sky (1984)
Billions for Boris (1984)
Snowballing (1984)
BMX Bandits (1983)
On the Run (1983)
Getting It On (1983)
The Final Terror (1983)
Hit and Run (1983)
One Dark Night (1983)
Somewhere, Tomorrow (1983)
Spring Fever (1982)
Night Warning (1982)
Ator l'invincibile (1982)
The Avenging (1982)
Hotwire (1980)

Film distributors of the United States
Defunct mass media companies of the United States
Mass media companies established in 1980
Mass media companies disestablished in 1986